Alan Sánchez (born November 23, 1985) is an Argentine footballer currently playing for Juventud Antoniana in the Torneo Argentino A

Personal life
He is the son of the Argentine coach Juan Amador Sánchez.

References
 

1985 births
Living people
Argentine footballers
Argentine expatriate footballers
O'Higgins F.C. footballers
Club Atlético Platense footballers
Club Atlético Huracán footballers
Boca Unidos footballers
Levadiakos F.C. players
Super League Greece players
Expatriate footballers in Chile
Expatriate footballers in Greece
Association football midfielders
Footballers from Buenos Aires